The 2012 Chicago Pythons season was the first and only season for the Continental Indoor Football League (CIFL) franchise.

On December 9, 2011 it was announced that the Vipers and the Evansville Rage would become the 5th and 6th expansion teams for the 2012 CIFL season. The Vipers will host only three games for the 2012 season and also have availability to host for the playoffs should they qualify. Co-owners Richard Petroski Jr. and Michael Duran are both looking to bring back a positive image for Chicago CIFL teams as last two have left a bad taste in the fans mouths. The team was originally scheduled to play their home games at the Odeum Expo Center in Villa Park, but later decided to play at the Megaplex in Homer Glen, Illinois. The team began the season as the "Chicago Vipers," but changed their names to the Chicago Pythons four weeks into the season when the Mike Duran became the sole owner of the team.

Players

Signings

Final roster

Regular season

Regular season

Standings

Week 1: vs Port Huron Patriots

In the first ever regular season game for the Vipers and Patriots, it was a tale of two halves. The Patriots started the scoring on an 8-yard run by Tracey McIntyre less than two minutes into the game followed by a 39-yard pass from Darryl Johnson to Jose Morris to grab a 14-0 Patriot lead. Chicago answered on a 4-yard touchdown run by Bill Ziemba, but the Patriots extended their lead to 20–7 as Johnson and McIntyre hooked up for a 25-yard touchdown pass. Chicago quarterback Anthony Kropp added a 1-yard touchdown run and Port Huron capped the first quarter scoring on a 19-yard touchdown pass from Johnson to Morris. The Patriots' first points of the second quarter came from a safety when the snap was over the head of Kropp and recovered by the Vipers in the end zone. Darryl Johnson threw his fourth touchdown of the half on a 7-yard pass to Dan Johnson. The Patriots added an 11-yard touchdown run by McIntyre to close the first half scoring. The Vipers outscored the Patriots 21–6 in the third quarter and pulled within 11, trailing 46–35. The third-quarter scoring was started by Chicago, who on a 12-yard pass from Kropp to Dan Carter. Port Huron quarterback Darryl Johnson added a 3-yard touchdown run to keep the Patriots' lead at 25. The next four scores in the game belonged to the Vipers. Kropp threw another touchdown pass to Dominique Jackson, this one 27 yards and Khyree Copeland added a touchdown run from 2 yards to end the third quarter. The 11-point lead heading into the fourth quarter quickly disappeared as defensive back Lawrence Harvey intercepted Johnson and returned it for a 13-yard touchdown. Just 30 seconds into the final quarter and the lead was trimmed to just four. The Vipers took their first lead of the game as Johnson completed a pass to Dominique Jackson at the Port Huron 16. Jackson fumbled the football and it was picked up by Dan Carter at the 5-yard line and taken in for a touchdown. Julie Harshbarger added the extra point and Chicago led 49–46. The game-winning score came with just over two minutes to play as Mark Carter scored from 1-yard out to put the Patriots up 52-49. Chicago had one last chance to tie the game, but Harshbarger's kick was no good as time expired.

With the loss, the Vipers fell to 0–1.

Week 2: vs Saginaw Sting

With the loss, the Vipers fell to 0-2.

Week 3: vs Dayton Silverbacks

In the first quarter Sawyer hit a wide-open Tyler Waller on a 26-yard pass play and it was quickly 6–0 as the extra point was blocked. After a safety it was 8–0 Dayton after the first quarter.
 
In the second quarter after Chicago kicker Julie Harshbarger missed a 27-yard field goal Evan sawyer capped off an eight-play drive with a six-yard run and with the extra point made it 15–0 Silverbacks, but the Vipers came right back and scored with less than a minute to go in the first half; Anthony Kropp connected with Dan Carter, who made a one-handed catch in the end zone and it was 15-6 Silverbacks. Just seconds later the Silverbacks answered with a six-yard pass from Evan Sawyer to Bruce Peters and it was 21–6 at the half.
 
After the Silverback defense stopped the Vipers at their own 14, two plays later Evan Sawyer scored on an eight-yard run and a Zach VanZant extra point made it a 27-6 Dayton lead. Chicago came back with a score of their own on an Anthony Kropp nine-yard pass to Dan Carter; the extra point was good and it was 27–13 Dayton. Dayton put it away after Sawyer scampered in on a one-yard run with 1:19 left in the third quarter and it was 34–13 Silverbacks after the third quarter.
 
In the final quarter, Dayton's Chris Stanford hit Lawrence Green on a four-yard pass and Marcus Fails intercepted a pass and ran it in from 25 yards out and it was a 48-13.

With the loss, the Vipers fell to 0–3.

Coaching staff

References

2012
2012 Continental Indoor Football League season
Chicago Pythons